Hullraisers is a British sitcom written by Lucy Beaumont, Anne-Marie O'Connor and Caroline Moran, based in Kingston upon Hull, England. Beaumont wrote the pilot after being approached by Fable to create an adaptation of the Israeli show, Little Mom. O'Connor and Moran came on board when the series was commissioned for Channel 4.

Hullraisers follows the lives of struggling actress and mother Toni, her older sister Paula, along with family friend and police officer Rana, a sexually confident woman who is the only member of the friendship group who is unmarried and childless. Beaumont felt that it was important to set the show in Hull, due to the city's lack of representation in UK media.
Beaumont said of the show, "I'm really proud of it because I feel like everyone was on the same page with the class thing. There are a lot of production companies that are very London-centric. We see so few authentic working-class representations, especially in comedy, I've had so little to refer to and that annoyed me."O'Connor said of the show, "If you go to Bradford or Hull you could watch two women talking from a distance and you’d think they were having a fight. But then you get nearer and you realise they’re just discussing what they’re having for their tea. It’s not a Ken Loach film, it’s not misery tourism. Life’s a laugh, isn’t it? I've had some of the worst jobs in the world, but I’ve had a laugh while I'm doing it because otherwise, what else are you going to do? Just work 12 hours in a factory and be miserable? You make the fun where you are."Moran said of the show, "I grew up in a council house on benefits and seeing working-class life on TV was very affirming. There were these funny, intelligent, characters who weren't just the butt of the joke, but the people making the jokes. There have been, lately, a lot of middle-class, aspirational shows. Hullraisers has a different take. Lucy doesn't want to send the place up, she wants to celebrate it."

A second series was confirmed in August 2022.

Cast and characters 
 Leah Brotherhead as Toni
 Sinead Matthews as Paula
 Taj Atwal as Rana
 Perry Fitzpatrick as Craig
 Natalie Davies as Ashley
 Matilda Firth as Grace
 Yanick Ghanty as Dane
 Shobna Gulati as Nima
 Jaylan Batten as Jake
 Oliver Turner as Luke
 Felicity Montagu as Gloria
 Pippa Fulton as Leanne

Episodes 
All episodes were made available on All4 following the first episode's premiere on April 12, 2022.

References

External links 
 
 

2022 British television series debuts
2020s British sitcoms
British television series based on non-British television series
Channel 4 sitcoms
Culture in Kingston upon Hull
English-language television shows
Television series about couples
Television series about sisters
Television shows set in Yorkshire
Television shows shot in Leeds
Television series by Sony Pictures Television